Laske:
 Ernst Laske
 Gabi Laske
 Gotthard Laske
 Jennifer Laske
 Lawrence Laske
 Oskar Laske (de)
 Otto Laske
 Laske (Ralbitz-Rosenthal), Ralbitz-Rosenthal 
 Laske Hundred (sv), Sweden. See List of hundreds of Sweden

See also
 Łask, Lask (disambiguation)
 Łaska, Laska
 Łaski, Laski (disambiguation), Lasky
 Lasker (disambiguation)

Slavic-language surnames